Poster Girl is the third studio album by Swedish singer Zara Larsson and her second released internationally. It was released on 5 March 2021 through TEN Music Group and Epic Records.  

The album was preceded by three singles: "Love Me Land", "Wow" and "Talk About Love", the latter featuring guest vocals from Young Thug. It also includes the 2018 single "Ruin My Life" and the promotional single "Look What You've Done". The album received generally positive reviews from music critics upon its release. Musically, Poster Girl is primarily a Scandipop, pop and dance record with elements of 80s synth-pop and disco.

Commercially, the album debuted at number three on the Swedish Albums Chart, 12 on the UK Albums Chart, and 170 on the US Billboard 200. A deluxe edition of the album, subtitled Summer Edition with six additional songs was released on 21 May 2021. Larsson embarked on the Poster Girl Tour in November 2021 to promote the album.

Composition
The album has been called a "dance record from start to finish, fast-paced and symphonic" with no ballads and "'80s synths and R&B-influenced production". Its lyrical content "explore[s] the best and worst parts of pop music's bread and butter: love". Also rooted in Scandipop and pop, it was additionally described as "both a break-up album and a loved-up celebration of a new romance", as well as "weaving themes of unrequited devotion and sobering flits of romantic toxicity into near scientifically engineered pop songs".

Songs
The album opens with "Love Me Land", a dance-pop song built around a "pulsing, string-led" beat. "Talk About Love" is an R&B-styled song with a "mellow" feel, which, lyrically, is about the "phase before two people work out what they are to one another". "Need Someone" is a "glistening", midtempo tune, which has an "airy, easy-going vibe", but builds into a "much funkier, bigger anthem", and, musically, has a bassline reminiscent of Tame Impala's "The Less I Know the Better" and a "twinkly" piano line. "Right Here" is about a wondering of why she tries to get the attention of someone who "keeps his eyes on the screen", and references Swedish artist Robyn. "Wow" is an electro and EDM song produced by Marshmello, which has a "bold" bassline and "addictive" vocals. The album's title track is about Zara "feeling out of character as she develops a crush", backed by "glittery" disco production. "I Need Love" is a tropical pop song, that has been described as a "soulful bop", which includes the lyrics: "like an addict needs a drug". "Look What You've Done" is a disco-tinged, breakup track which bears resemblance to the music of ABBA. 

"Ruin My Life" is a "faintly masochistic", pop song, which, in Larsson's words, is about "that unhealthy relationship that everyone has at one point in their life". Instrumentation-wise, it is accompanied by an electric guitar and keyboard, and its chorus is "swimming" with synths and a "danceable" drum track. "Stick with You", co-written by Max Martin, has a guitar sound paired with a "driving", electronic beat and sees Larsson's vocal with a "slight country twang". "FFF" (shorthand for "Falling for a Friend") is "playful", though "explicit"; its refrain is reminiscent of Italian classic "Tu Vuò Fà L'Americano". Vocals with similarity to Dua Lipa, on the song, sing: "Is there a spark for us?/Or is it just purely platonic?/Is this our story arc?/'Cause if it are, it’d be iconic". The album closes with "What Happens Here" has a story of self-assurance and is a "Carly Rae Jepsen-sized euphoric" song, in which she sings: "I'ma do it 'cause it's what I want… To be honest, I don't give no fucks".

Singles
The album was preceded by several singles. The first, "Ruin My Life", was released on 18 October 2018 and charted in several countries, reaching the top ten in Israel, United Kingdom, Ireland and her native Sweden, peaking at number two. Several standalone singles and collaborations followed between 2018 and 2020, including "Don't Worry Bout Me" and "All the Time". Both songs were later included on the Japanese edition of the album.

The proper lead single "Love Me Land" arrived on 10 July 2020, peaking at number eight and later being certificated Gold in Sweden. The previously released promotional single "Wow", produced by Marshmello, made a resurgence in popularity after being featured on the 2020 Netflix original movie Work It. This led to Larsson releasing the track as a single. A remix featuring the film's lead actress Sabrina Carpenter was unveiled on 25 September 2020 with its own music video premiering on 7 October. Another single, "Talk About Love" featuring American rapper Young Thug came out on 8 January 2021 with the album's pre-order.

Promotional single 

"Look What You've Done" was released as the album's only promotional single on 22 February 2021.

Release and promotion
Larsson shared the cover art of the album in 8 January 2021, and revealed the track listing on social media on 10 February 2021. The deluxe edition of the album entitled the “Summer Edition” was released on May 21, 2021 including two new songs and multiple new versions of past songs.

To promote the record, Larsson held an online concert on 8 March 2021 for International Women's Day, in partnership with IKEA and presented by Live Nation. To celebrate the release of the “Summer Edition” of the album she held a virtual album release party on Roblox on May 21, 2021 with reruns airing throughout that weekend. Larsson embarked on the Poster Girl Tour in support of the album in November 2021.

Critical reception

At Metacritic, which assigns a normalised to reviews from professional publications, Poster Girl has an average score of 72 out of 100, based on nine reviews, indicating "generally favourable reviews".

Writing for NME, Nick Levine described the album as a "catchy and characterful" one, that "feels like a job well done", while DIY's Emma Swann called the album "pure pop escapism". Robin Murray of Clash wrote that Poster Girl is "not all perfect", but an "entertaining" album. Ludovic Hunter-Tilney of the Financial Times described the songs as "nimble and breezy", though said that the album "leaves one impatient for more".

Track listing

Personnel
Performers

 Zara Larsson – vocals
 Jason Gill – all instruments (1)
 Mattman & Robin – all instruments (3, 4)
 Noonie Bao – background vocals (3)
 Sarah Aarons – background vocals (3)
 Julia Michaels – background vocals (4)
 Marshmello – programming (5)
 Starsmith – all instruments (7)
 Chris Laws – drums (8)
 John Parricelli – guitar (8)
 Steve Mac – keyboards (8)
 Brittany Amaradio – background vocals (9)
 Jackson Foote – programming (9)
 Michael Pollack – piano (9)
 The Monsters & Strangerz – programming (9)
 A Strut – all instruments (10)
 Max Martin – background vocals (10)
 Fatmax Gsus – guitar (10)
 James Wong – synthesizer, guitar and drum programming (14)

Technical

 Michelle Mancini – mastering engineer
 Serban Ghenea – mixing engineer (1–4, 6, 7, 10, 15–16)
 Manny Marroquin – mixing engineer (5, 14)
 Mark "Spike" Stent – mixing engineer (8)
 Tony Maserati – mixing engineer (9)
 Rafael Fadul – mixing engineer (13)
 Lotus IV – mixing engineer (16)
 John Hanes – engineer (1–4, 6, 7, 10, 15–16)
 Jonathan Winner – engineer (6)
 Sam Homaee – engineer (6)
 Chris Laws – engineer (8)
 Dann Pursey – engineer (8)
 Ian Kirkpatrick – engineer (11)
 Bart Schoudel – vocal engineer (2, 3), recording engineer (4)
 Mattman & Robin – vocal engineer (3, 4)
 Hampus Lindvall – vocal engineer (7), recording engineer (9)
 Billy Hicks – recording engineer (12)
 Gian Stone – recording engineer (13)
 DJ Riggins – assistant engineer (2)
 Jacob Richards – assistant engineer (2)
 Mike Seaberg – assistant engineer (2)
 Robert N. Johnson – assistant engineer (5)

Artwork
 Ryder Ripps – creative and art direction
 Michaela Quan – photographer
 Jordan Rossi – photographer
 Karen Clarkson – stylist
 Sofia Sinot – make-up
 Ali Pirzadeh – hair

Charts

Weekly charts

Year-end charts

Certifications

Release history

References

2021 albums
Zara Larsson albums
Albums produced by Ian Kirkpatrick (record producer)
Albums produced by Jason Gill (musician)
Albums produced by Marshmello
Albums produced by Steve Mac
Black Butter Records albums
Epic Records albums
TEN Music Group albums